The Bear River (Leech Lake River) is a river of Minnesota. It is a tributary of the Leech Lake River.

See also
List of rivers of Minnesota

References

Minnesota Watersheds
USGS Hydrologic Unit Map - State of Minnesota (1974)

Rivers of Minnesota